Frist is a surname. Notable people with the surname include:

Bill Frist (born 1952), American physician, businessman, and politician
Patricia C. Frist, American businesswoman and philanthropist.
Thomas F. Frist, Jr. (born c. 1939), American businessman
Thomas F. Frist, Sr. (1910–1998), American businessman
Thomas F. Frist, III, American businessman.
William R. Frist, American businessman.